, or MCC, is a subsidiary of Mitsubishi Chemical Holdings Corporation.  It is a Japanese corporation, that merged with Mitsubishi Pharma Corporation in 2005 to create Mitsubishi Chemical Holdings Corporation.  Mitsubishi Chemical is the largest chemical corporation based in Japan.

MCC is co-owner with Oji Paper Company of Yupo brand synthetic paper.

See also
 Mitsubishi Kagaku Media
 Verbatim – A brand that was formerly owned by Mitsubishi Chemical Corporation

References

External links
 

Chemical companies based in Tokyo
Companies formerly listed on the Tokyo Stock Exchange
Golf equipment manufacturers
Mitsubishi Chemical Holdings
Mitsubishi companies